The Khalkh River (also spelled as Khalkha River or Halaha River; ;  Ha-la-ha; Ha-lo-hsin Ho) is a river in eastern Mongolia and northern China's Inner Mongolia region. The river is also referred to with the Mongolian genitive suffix -iin as the Khalkhyn Gol, or River of Khalkh.

The river's source is the western slopes of the Greater Khingan mountains of Inner Mongolia. The left branch (the Halh River proper) flows into the Buir Lake
The Chinese–Mongolian border then follows the Shariljiin Gol for about an equal distance.

From May to September 1939, the river was the site of the Battles of Khalkhin Gol, the decisive engagement of the Soviet-Japanese border conflicts. Soviet and Mongolian forces defeated the Japanese Kwantung Army.

References

Rivers of Mongolia
International rivers of Asia